George Roy McWilliam (July 21, 1905 – May 15, 1977) was a Member of Parliament in the Canadian House of Commons for the constituency of Northumberland—Miramichi in New Brunswick from 1949 until 1968. He was a resident of Newcastle, New Brunswick for most of his life, where he was the publisher and editor of the North Shore Leader, a local weekly newspaper.

Early life
McWilliam was born in Sydney, Nova Scotia.

Political career
McWilliam was a Liberal and served as Parliamentary Secretary to the Postmaster-General from 1963 to 1964 and to the Minister of Public Works from 1964 to 1965.

McWilliam served as MP through the middle of a long period of Liberal ascendancy in the Miramichi Valley. The coalition that sustained the Liberal Party was centered on the Irish vote, especially from the town of Chatham where they formed the majority, buttressed by the votes of the Irish minority in Newcastle, and the smaller Irish villages like St. Margarets, Barnaby River and Sevogle. Added to this were the votes of the French-speaking Acadians of Neguac, Rogersville, Beaverbrook and Baie-Sainte-Anne and surrounding areas. The majority of Protestants voted Progressive Conservative, but there were always a minority who supported the Liberals.

Although Catholics generally supported the Liberal Party, the Irish Catholic clergy did not generally involve themselves in politics.

Personal life
Roy McWilliam's sister was the noted Miramichi historian Edith McAllister.

Electoral record

External links
 

1905 births
1977 deaths
Liberal Party of Canada MPs
Members of the House of Commons of Canada from New Brunswick
People from Miramichi, New Brunswick